The women's 200 metre backstroke event at the 2014 Commonwealth Games as part of the swimming programme took place on 27 July at the Tollcross International Swimming Centre in Glasgow, Scotland.

The medals were presented by David Sparkes, Chief Executive Officer of British Swimming and the quaichs were presented by Ian Mason, Director of World Class Operations, British Swimming.

Records
Prior to this competition, the existing world and Commonwealth Games records were as follows.

The following records were established during the competition:

Results

Heats

Final

References

External links

Women's 200 metre backstroke
Commonwealth Games
2014 in women's swimming